Frank Miller (born 1957) is an American comics writer, artist, and film director.

Frank Miller may also refer to:

Arts and entertainment
Frank Miller (screenwriter) (1891–1950), British writer, director, actor
Frank Miller (newspaper cartoonist) (1898–1949), newspaper comic strip creator
Frank Miller (cellist) (1912–1986), cellist with NBC Symphony Orchestra
Frank Miller (singer) (1918-2015), pop singer with The Easy Riders
Frank Miller (editorial cartoonist) (1926–1983), editorial cartoonist
Frank Miller (actor) (1944–1998), American actor best known as the mission controller from film  A Space Odyssey

Military
Frank Miller (Medal of Honor) (1848–1903), American Civil War soldier and Medal of Honor recipient
Frank Robert Miller (1908–1997), Canadian military aviator, Canada's last chairman of the Chiefs of Staff and first chief of the Defence Staff, and deputy minister of National Defence
An alias used by Frances Hook (1847–1908) while serving in the American Civil War

Sports
Frank Miller (infielder) (1867–1942), American baseball player
Frank Miller (South African cricketer) (1880–1958), South African cricketer
Frank Miller (pitcher) (1886–1974), Major League Baseball player 
Frank Miller (Irish cricketer) (1916–2000), Irish cricketer

Others
Frank Miller (cryptographer) (1842–1925), American banker and cryptographer
Frank Miller (politician) (1927–2000), 19th premier of Ontario, who came to power in 1985
Frank A. Miller (Brooklyn) (1888–1931), New York politician
Frank Augustus Miller (1858–1935), founder of the Mission Inn in Riverside, California
Frank Justus Miller (1858–1938), American classical scholar and translator
Frank P. Miller (1912–2000), helped to create the modern parole system in Canada
An alias used by Joseph James Bruno (c. 1878–1951) while escaped from prison

Characters
Frank Miller, the name of the antagonist in the 1952 western film High Noon
Frank Miller, the name of Junie B. Jones's maternal grandfather in the popular children's book series

See also
Franklin Miller (disambiguation)
Frank Millar (disambiguation)
Frankie Miller (born 1949), Scottish musician
Frankie Miller (country musician) (born 1931), American country musician
Francis Miller (disambiguation)